Toa Sum Jas (Macedonian Cyrillic: Тоа сум Јас) was a reality tv show in Macedonia. The show was the first original show worldwide. The contestants had to be closed from the outside world for 45 days in one house in Skopje. Allegedly the Dutch company Endemol that owns original Big Brother reality show has sued Toa Sum Jas for plagiarism. Dragi Hristov was the winner. Broadcasting Council of Macedonia also filed a misdemeanor charges for "Extremely obscene content may adversely affect the development of young people" to the producers.

Hosts
Toni Mihajlovski
Sanja Ristikj

See also
Macedonian Radio Television

External links
 Video of the Show from 21.05.2004

References

Macedonian television series
Macedonian Radio Television original programming